Kanan Guluyev is an Azerbaijani wrestler who participated at the 2010 Summer Youth Olympics in Singapore. He won the silver medal in the boys' freestyle 54 kg event, losing to Yuki Takahashi of Japan in the final.

References 

Wrestlers at the 2010 Summer Youth Olympics
Living people
Year of birth missing (living people)
21st-century Azerbaijani people